Asian Junior Volleyball Championship may refer to
 Asian Men's U20 Volleyball Championship
 Asian Women's U19 Volleyball Championship